USS Metha Nelson (IX‑74) was a wooden‑hulled sailing schooner of the United States Navy during World War II.

The ship was completed in 1896 by H. D. Hendrixsen of Eureka, California, and hauled cargo, primarily lumber, from Maine to Singapore, and appeared in several films. Included in her credits was the portrayal of Captain Bligh's ship in the 1935 film Mutiny on the Bounty.

Service history
Metha Nelson was purchased by the US Navy from Metro-Goldwyn-Mayer on 11 June 1942, converted by the Craig Shipyard, Long Beach, California, and placed on service 25 September 1943.

Charged with the identification of all ships trafficking in and out of Los Angeles, she lay off the city for the duration of her naval service, also acting as pilot ship.

Placed out of service on 25 September 1945, she was struck from the Naval Vessel Register on 24 October 1945, turned over to War Shipping Administration a week later, and sold back to her former owner.

References

External links
 

Ships built in Eureka, California
Schooners of the United States Navy
Lumber schooners
1896 ships